Roy Halstead (26 July 1931 – 6 August 1997) was an English footballer who played as an inside forward in the Football League for Chester.

References

1931 births
1997 deaths
Chester City F.C. players
Burnley F.C. players
Winsford United F.C. players
Association football inside forwards
English Football League players
English footballers